The Raghupathi Venkaiah Naidu Award is an award issued by the Indian state government of Andhra Pradesh, to recognise lifetime achievements in Telugu cinema. The award was introduced in 1981 in honour of Raghupathi Venkaiah Naidu, a pioneer of the Indian film industry.

Recipients

See also
 Dadasaheb Phalke

References

External links

Nandi Awards
Lifetime achievement awards
1981 establishments in Andhra Pradesh